Lisa Ann Murkowski (born May 22, 1957) is an American attorney and politician serving as the senior United States senator for Alaska, having held that seat since 2002. Murkowski is the second-most senior Republican woman in the Senate, after Susan Collins of Maine. She became the dean of Alaska's Congressional delegation upon Representative Don Young's death.

Murkowski is the daughter of former U.S. senator and governor of Alaska Frank Murkowski. Before her appointment to the Senate, she served in the Alaska House of Representatives and was elected majority leader. She was controversially appointed to the Senate by her father, who resigned his seat in December 2002 to become governor of Alaska. Murkowski completed her father's unexpired Senate term, which ended in January 2005, and became the first Alaskan-born member of Congress.

Murkowski ran for and won a full term in 2004. After losing the 2010 Republican primary to Tea Party candidate Joe Miller, Murkowski ran as a write-in candidate and defeated both Miller and Democrat Scott McAdams in the general election. She is the second U.S. senator (after Strom Thurmond in 1954) to be elected by write-in vote. Murkowski was elected to a third term in 2016 and a fourth term in 2022, running as a Republican.

Murkowski was vice chair of the Senate Republican Conference from 2009 to 2010. She served as chair of the Senate Energy and Natural Resources Committee from 2015 to 2021, and has served as vice chair of the Senate Indian Affairs Committee since 2021.

Murkowski is often described as one of the most moderate Republicans in the Senate and a crucial swing vote. According to CQ Roll Call, Murkowski voted with President Barack Obama's position 72.3% of the time in 2013, one of only two Republicans voting for his positions over 70% of the time. In recent years, she opposed Brett Kavanaugh and supported Ketanji Brown Jackson in their respective nominations to the Supreme Court. On February 13, 2021, Murkowski was one of seven Republican senators to vote to convict Donald Trump of incitement of insurrection in his second impeachment trial. Following this vote, she was censured by the Alaska Republican Party.

Early life, education, and early career

Murkowski was born in Ketchikan in the Territory of Alaska, the daughter of Nancy Rena (née Gore) and Frank Murkowski. Her paternal great-grandfather was of Polish descent, and her mother's ancestry is Irish and French Canadian. As a child, she and her family moved around the state with her father's job as a banker.

She earned a B.A. degree in economics from Georgetown University in 1980, the same year her father was elected to the U.S. Senate. She is a member of Pi Beta Phi sorority and represented Alaska as the 1980 Cherry Blossom Princess. She received her J.D. degree in 1985 from Willamette University College of Law.

Murkowski worked as an attorney in the Anchorage District Court Clerk's office from 1987 to 1989. From 1989 to 1998, she was an attorney in private practice in Anchorage. She served on the Mayor's Task Force for the Homeless from 1990 to 1991.

Alaska House of Representatives
In 1998, Murkowski was elected to the Alaska House of Representatives. Her District 18 included northeast Anchorage, Fort Richardson and Elmendorf Air Force Base (now Joint Base Elmendorf-Richardson, or JBER), and suburban parts of Eagle River-Chugiak. In 1999, she introduced legislation establishing a Joint Armed Services Committee. She was reelected in 2000 and, after her district boundaries changed, in 2002. That year she had a conservative primary opponent, Nancy Dahlstrom, who challenged her because Murkowski supported abortion rights and rejected conservative economics. Murkowski prevailed by 56 votes. She was named as House Majority Leader for the 2003–04 legislative session. She resigned her House seat before taking office, due to her appointment by her father to the seat he had vacated in the U.S. Senate, upon his stepping down to assume the Alaska governorship. Murkowski sat on the Alaska Commission on Post Secondary Education and chaired both the Labor and Commerce and the Military and Veterans Affairs Committees. After she resigned to join the U.S. Senate, her father appointed Dahlstrom, the District Republican committee's choice, as her replacement.

U.S. Senate

Appointment 
In December 2002, Murkowski—while a member of the state House—was appointed by her father, Governor Frank Murkowski, to fill his own U.S. Senate seat made vacant when he resigned from the Senate after being elected governor.

The appointment caused controversy in Alaska. Many voters disapproved of the nepotism. Her appointment eventually resulted in a referendum that stripped the governor of his power to directly appoint replacement Senators. Along with others eligible to be considered, future Alaska governor Sarah Palin interviewed unsuccessfully for the seat.

Elections 

Murkowski has won four full terms to the Senate; she won 48.6% of the vote in 2004, 39.5% in 2010, 44.4% in 2016 and 53.7% in 2022.

2004

Murkowski ran for a full Senate term against former Governor Tony Knowles in the 2004 election after winning a primary challenge by a large margin. She was considered vulnerable due to the controversy over her appointment, and polling showed the race was very close. The centrist Republican Main Street Partnership, which wanted to run TV ads for Murkowski, was told no airtime was left to buy. Near the end of the campaign, senior U.S. Senator Ted Stevens shot ads for Murkowski and claimed that if a Democrat replaced Murkowski, Alaska would likely receive fewer federal dollars. Murkowski defeated Knowles by a narrow margin.

2010

Murkowski faced the most difficult election of her career in the August 24, 2010, Republican Party primary election against Joe Miller, a former U.S. magistrate judge supported by former Governor Sarah Palin. The initial results showed her trailing Miller, 51–49%, with absentee ballots yet to be tallied. After the first round of absentee ballots were counted on August 31, Murkowski conceded, saying that she did not believe that Miller's lead could be overcome in the next round of absentee vote counting.

After the primary, the Murkowski campaign floated the idea of her running as a Libertarian in the general election. But on August 29, 2010, the state Libertarian Party executive board voted not to consider Murkowski as its Senate nominee.

On September 17, 2010, Murkowski said that she would mount a write-in campaign for the Senate seat. Her campaign was aided in large part by substantial monetary assistance from Native corporations and PACs, as well as state teachers' and firefighters' unions.

On November 17, 2010, the Associated Press reported that Murkowski had become only the second Senate candidate (after Strom Thurmond in 1954) to win a write-in campaign, thereby retaining her seat. She emerged victorious after a two-week count of write-in ballots showed she had overtaken Miller. Miller did not concede. U.S. Federal District Judge Ralph Beistline granted an injunction to stop the certification of the election due to "serious" legal issues and irregularities Miller raised about the hand count of absentee ballots. On December 10, 2010, an Alaskan judge dismissed Miller's case, clearing the way for Murkowski, but on December 13, Miller appealed the Alaska Superior Court decision of the previous week to the Alaska Supreme Court. The state Supreme Court rejected Miller's appeal on December 22. On December 28, U.S. District Judge Ralph Beistline dismissed Miller's lawsuit. Governor Sean Parnell certified Murkowski as the winner on December 30.

2016

After securing the Republican Party nomination by a wide margin, Murkowski was again reelected to the Senate in 2016. Joe Miller, this time the Libertarian Party nominee, was again the runner-up.

The election was unusual in featuring a Libertarian Party nominee who endorsed the Republican presidential nominee, Donald Trump, running against a Republican incumbent who did not. The Libertarian vice-presidential nominee, former Governor of Massachusetts Bill Weld, endorsed Murkowski, citing Miller's support for Trump and "devoted social conservative" views as incompatible with libertarianism.

2022

In 2017, Murkowski filed to run for a fourth term in 2022. Due to her opposition to some of his initiatives and her vote to convict him during his second impeachment trial, former President Donald Trump pledged in June 2020 to campaign against Murkowski, implicitly endorsing a primary challenge in the process. Of the seven Republican senators who voted to convict Trump, Murkowski was the only one up for reelection in 2022. After the second impeachment trial, Alaska's GOP had censured her and demanded her resignation. Despite Trump's pledge, Senate Minority Leader Mitch McConnell signaled Republican senators' commitment to back Murkowski's 2022 campaign.

On June 18, 2021, Trump endorsed former Alaska Department of Administration commissioner Kelly Tshibaka for the Senate in 2022, calling her "MAGA all the way". Murkowski later called Tshibaka "apparently...someone with a pulse", referencing Trump's previous statement that "if [any 2022 Murkowski challenger has] a pulse, [he is] with [them]". On July 10, 2021, the Alaska Republican Party endorsed Tshibaka. Murkowski won reelection by beating Tshibaka in ranked-choice voting. Murkowski's votes amounted to 53.7% after the ranked-choice tabulation.

Tenure and political positions 

Murkowski is considered a moderate Republican. Since she was reelected in 2010, some have deemed her voting record "more moderate" than that of her previous years in the Senate. In 2013, the National Journal gave Murkowski a composite score of 56% conservative and 45% liberal and ranked her the 56th most liberal and 44th most conservative member of the Senate.

According to GovTrack, Murkowski is the second most liberal Republican senator and, is placed by GovTrack's analysis to the left of all Republicans except Susan Collins, and to the left of Democratic Senator Joe Manchin. The New York Times arranged Republican senators by ideology and also ranked Murkowski the second most liberal Republican. According to FiveThirtyEight, which tracks Congressional votes, she voted with Trump's position approximately 72.6% of the time . According to FiveThirtyEight, as of October 2022, Murkowski has voted with Biden's position about 67% of the time. According to CQ Roll Call, Murkowski voted with President Barack Obama's position 72.3% of the time in 2013, one of only two Republicans voting for his positions over 70% of the time. According to the American Conservative Union's Center for Legislative Accountability, Murkowski has a lifetime conservative score of 56.72. The liberal Americans for Democratic Action gave her a score of 10% in 2019.

In 2018, she voted "present" on the confirmation of Justice Brett Kavanaugh to the Supreme Court of the United States as a favor to Senator Steve Daines, who was unable to attend the vote because his daughter's wedding took place that day. In 2020, she voted against procedural motions to accelerate Amy Coney Barrett's confirmation to that court, though she later voted to confirm Barrett. On April 7, 2022, she voted to confirm Ketanji Brown Jackson to the Supreme Court, with only two other Republicans joining her: Mitt Romney and Susan Collins.

In a March 2019 op-ed for The Washington Post, Murkowski and Joe Manchin wrote that climate change debate in Congress was depicted  as "an issue with just two sides—those who support drastic, unattainable measures to reduce greenhouse-gas emissions, and those who want to do nothing" and affirmed their support for "adopting reasonable policies that maintain that edge, build on and accelerate current efforts, and ensure a robust innovation ecosystem."

In December 2020, during his lame-duck period, Trump vetoed the National Defense Authorization Act for Fiscal Year 2021.  The veto left new Coast Guard cutters that were scheduled to be homeported in Alaska without port facilities to maintain them. Murkowski issued a press release that said, in part, "It’s incredible that the President chose to veto the annual National Defense Authorization Act, particularly because his reason for doing so is an issue not related to national defense."

After Trump supporters attacked the United States Capitol on January 6, 2021, Murkowski said Trump should resign for inciting the insurrection. With this call for his resignation, she became the first Republican in the Senate to say that Trump should leave office before the inauguration of Joe Biden. When asked whether she would remain a Republican, she replied, "if the Republican Party has become nothing more than the party of Trump, I sincerely question whether this is the party for me", but added, "I have absolutely no desire to move over to the Democratic side of the aisle. I can't be somebody that I'm not." On May 27, 2021, along with five other Republicans and all present Democrats, Murkowski voted to establish a bipartisan commission to investigate the Capitol attack. The vote failed for lack of 60 required "yes" votes. She was one of seven Republican senators to vote on February 13, 2021, to convict Trump in his second impeachment trial. That vote failed for lack of a two-thirds majority.

Murkowski, along with all other Senate and House Republicans, voted against the American Rescue Plan Act of 2021. On September 30, 2021, she was among the 15 Senate Republicans to vote with all Democrats and both Independents for a temporary spending bill to avoid a government shutdown.  On October 7, 2021, Murkowski voted with 10 other Republicans and all members of the Democratic caucus to break the filibuster of raising the debt ceiling. However, she voted with all Republicans against the bill to raise the debt ceiling. On February 5, 2022, Murkowski joined Arkansas Governor Asa Hutchinson in condemning the Republican National Committee's censure of Representatives Adam Kinzinger and Liz Cheney for supporting and participating in the Select Committee of the U.S. House that was tasked with investigating the January 6 United States Capitol attack. The RNC contended that the Capitol riot was "legitimate political discourse." During her 2022 reelection campaign, Murkowski was supported by Democratic colleagues, including Jeanne Shaheen, and Independent Senator Angus King.

Murkowski supports the Equal Rights Amendment.

As of 2023, Murkowski supports ConocoPhillips's controversial Willow oil drilling project on North Slope Borough, Alaska.

Committee assignments 
 Committee on Appropriations
 Subcommittee on Commerce, Justice, Science, and Related Agencies
 Subcommittee on Homeland Security
 Subcommittee on Interior, Environment, and Related Agencies (Ranking Member)
 Subcommittee on Legislative Branch
 Subcommittee on Military Construction, Veterans Affairs, and Related Agencies
 Committee on Energy and Natural Resources
 Committee on Health, Education, Labor, and Pensions
 Subcommittee on Children and Families
 Subcommittee on Employment and Workplace Safety
 Committee on Indian Affairs (Vice Chair)

Caucus memberships
 Senate Oceans Caucus (co-chairwoman)
 Senate Cultural Caucus
Afterschool Caucuses
Senate Republican Conference

Electoral history

Personal life

Murkowski is married to Verne Martell. They have two sons, Nicolas and Matthew. Murkowski is Roman Catholic. 

As of 2018, according to OpenSecrets.org, Murkowski's net worth was more than $1.4 million.

Property sale controversy
In July 2007, Murkowski said she would sell back land she bought from Anchorage businessman Bob Penney, a day after a Washington watchdog group filed a Senate ethics complaint against her alleging that Penney sold the property well below market value. The Anchorage Daily News wrote, "The transaction amounted to an illegal gift worth between $70,000 and $170,000, depending on how the property was valued, according to the complaint by the National Legal and Policy Center." According to the Associated Press, Murkowski bought the land from two developers tied to the Ted Stevens probe.

In 2008, Murkowski amended her Senate financial disclosures for 2004 through 2006, adding income of $60,000 per year from the sale of a property in 2003, and more than $40,000 a year from the sale of her "Alaska Pasta Company" in 2005.

See also

 Women in the United States Senate
 Arctic Policy of the United States

Notes

References

External links

 Senator Lisa Murkowski official U.S. Senate website
 Lisa Murkowski for Senate
 
 
 
 Interview-impeachment process 
 Lisa Murkowski at 100 Years of Alaska's Legislature

|-

|-

|-

|-

|-

|-

|-

|-

|-

|-

1957 births
21st-century American politicians
21st-century American women politicians
Alaska lawyers
American people of French-Canadian descent
American people of Irish descent
American politicians of Polish descent
American Roman Catholics
American women lawyers
Catholics from Alaska
Female United States senators
Georgetown University alumni
Lawyers from Anchorage, Alaska
Lawyers from Fairbanks, Alaska
Living people
Republican Party members of the Alaska House of Representatives
Politicians from Anchorage, Alaska
Politicians from Fairbanks, Alaska
People from Ketchikan, Alaska
People from Wrangell, Alaska
Recipients of the Order of the Falcon
Republican Party United States senators from Alaska
Willamette University College of Law alumni
Women state legislators in Alaska
American beauty pageant winners
Beauty queen-politicians
Equal Rights Amendment